Cycas scratchleyana is a species of cycad native to New Guinea and Queensland. In New Guinea, it is widespread in the eastern part of the island.

References

scratchleyana
Flora of New Guinea
Flora of Queensland